Oliver's Travels is a five-part television serial written by Alan Plater and starring Alan Bates, Sinéad Cusack, Bill Paterson, and Miles Anderson. It first aired in the UK in 1995.

Plot
Bates plays the titular Oliver (it is never made clear whether this is his first or last name), a keen word-game enthusiast and lecturer in comparative religion. After his teaching post is made redundant, he resolves to make use of his new wealth of free time by going to visit his favourite crossword compiler, 'Aristotle', with whom he has corresponded but whom he has never met. When he arrives, however, he finds Aristotle's house has been ransacked and its occupant has departed for parts unknown, and he sets out to discover why.

Accompanied by WPC Diane Priest (Cusack) (suspended from the police for voicing suspicions about a senior officer), and doggedly pursued by the mysterious Mr. Baxter (Paterson), he finds himself caught up in all manner of nefarious activities, leading from South Wales to a surprising twist ending in the Orkney islands.

Cast
 Alan Bates as Oliver 
 Sinéad Cusack as WPC Diane Priest 
 Bill Paterson as Baxter 
 Morgan Jones as Michael Priest 
 Miles Anderson as Baron Kite 
 Peter Vaughan as Delaney 
 Charlotte Coleman as Cathy

Production
The series was developed from Alan Plater's own novel.

External links

Oliver's Travels at the PBS Mystery! web site

1995 British television series debuts
1995 British television series endings
1990s British drama television series
BBC television dramas
1990s British television miniseries
Television shows set in Wales
English-language television shows
1990s British mystery television series